Robert Howard Quayle  is the former chief minister for the Isle of Man, between 4 October 2016. and 12 October 2021. He previously served as the minister for Health and Social Care, until the elections in September 2016.

Early career 
Quayle began his working life as a civil servant in the treasury and local government planning before moving into the finance sector, working for the NFU Mutual Insurance Group and Clerical Medical.

Eventually, he followed his father into farming and served as vice-president of the Manx National Farmers' Union for two years before taking over as president, from 2005 to 2010.

Political career 
In 2011, Quayle was elected to the House of Keys for the constituency of Middle with 41.9% of the vote, unseating incumbent MHK and Minister for Social Care Martyn Quayle. In 2016, he was re-elected as one of the two MHKs for Middle under the revised electoral arrangements. With electors now having two votes each, Quayle increased his number of votes, but he saw his vote share decrease under the new system and failed to top the poll, coming second to Bill Shimmins.  Quayle was sworn into the House of Keys on 4 October 2016 and was subsequently elected as Chief Minister by Tynwald.

In May 2021 he stated that he would not seek re-election in the 2021 Manx general election. On 17 September 2021, shortly before the election, he suffered a stroke and was hospitalised for four days.

Quayle was appointed Commander of the Order of the British Empire (CBE) in the 2021 Birthday Honours for services to the people of the Isle of Man.

Governmental positions 

 Chief Minister, 2016–2021
Minister for Enterprise, 2021
 Minister for Health and Social Care, 2014–2016
 Member of the Department for Economic Development, 2013–2014
 Member of the Manx Electricity Authority, 2013–2014
 Member of the Department of Infrastructure, 2011–2013
 Member of the Economic Policy Review Committee, 2011–2013
 Member of the Planning Committee, 2011–2013

Election results

2011

2016 
In 2014, Tynwald approved recommendations from the Boundary Review Commission which saw the reform of the Island's electoral boundaries.

Under the new system, the Island was divided into 12 constituencies based on population, with each area represented by two members of the House of Keys.

As a result, Middle's electoral boundaries were changed significantly and the constituency gained an additional Member of the House of Keys.

Personal life 
He is married to Lorraine, with whom he has three children. Quayle has also worked as a farmer and has raised an award-winning herd of pedigree Aberdeen Angus cattle.

References

Members of the House of Keys 2011–2016
Members of the House of Keys 2016–2021
Living people
Chief Ministers of the Isle of Man
1967 births
Commanders of the Order of the British Empire